Solbergbakken was a K60 ski jumping hill located at Valler (Gjettum) in Bærum, Norway and owned by Bærums SK.

History
On 29 January 1888, Solbergbakken located at the western suburb of Oslo, was officially opened as one of the largest in the world, but already constructed in 1886. Total of four official world records have been set. 

On 5 February 1899, Asbjørn Nilssen and Morten Hansen set 32.5 meters (107 ft), while Olaf Tandberg improved it at 35.5 meters (116 ft) the following year.

Between 1897 and 1902 also total of six invalid world record were set by Norwegian men; Cato Aall (31.5 m), Asbjørn Nilssen (35 m), Trygve Smith (36 m), Aksel Refstad (2 x 36 m) and Albert Wüller (36.5 m).

On 6 February 1910, Hilda Stang from Norway set the only world record for women on this hill at 22 meters (77 ft). 

In 1917, the ski jump was extended for the first time and reopened with a new hill record of 44 meters (144 ft). And two years later 15,000 spectators attended “Hovedlandsrenn”.

In 1935, for the first time, the 50 meter bench-mark was over-leaped. From 1955 on, the facility was only used as training ski jumping hill, on larger Skuibakken Bærums Skiklub even hosted several Norwegian Championships and two World Cup competitions. In 1977, the 60 meter hill was covered with plastic matting and in 1992 the very last summer competition on plastic was hosted there. 

When Bærums SK arranged Norwegian Championships, these were normally held in the hill Skuibakken. The Nazi national championships were however held in Solbergbakken in 1942 and 1943.

Ski jumping world records

Men

Ladies

References

External links
Video clip, 1924 barum.folkebibl.no
Solbergbakken skisprungschanzen.com

Ski jumping venues in Norway
Sports venues in Bærum